Carlia luctuosa is a species of skink in the genus Carlia. It is endemic to Papua New Guinea.

References

Carlia
Reptiles described in 1878
Endemic fauna of Papua New Guinea
Reptiles of Papua New Guinea
Taxa named by Wilhelm Peters
Taxa named by Giacomo Doria
Skinks of New Guinea